Porta Metronia, previously known with the name Amba Aradam-Ipponio, is an underground station under construction of Line C of the Rome Metro. The station will be located between two important interchanges of the Roman metro system – the station Fori Imperali-Colosseo (Line B) and San Giovanni (Line A). Construction works started in 2013. The station is expected to become operational with the inauguration of the extension of Line C from San Giovanni to Fori Imperiali-Colosseo in 2024.

In the summer of 2020, in the wake of the protests triggered by the Black Lives Matter movement, Mayor Virginia Raggi proposed a record in the Capitoline Assembly, which was later approved, to name the station after the Italian-Somali partisan Giorgio Marincola. Amba Aradam was the site of the decisive and gruesome Battle of Amba Aradam of the Second Italo-Ethiopian War, followed by a massacre of Ethiopian troops. On September 14, 2022, it was announced that the new name of the station would be "Porta Metronia", from the nearby namesake gate in the Aurelian Walls.

References

Rome Metro Line C stations
Rome Q. IX Appio-Latino